Henry Thomas Selover (24 July 1898 – 18 May 2001) was an Australian rules footballer who played with Melbourne in the Victorian Football League (VFL).

Family
The fourth and youngest child of William Henry Selover, and Ellen Selover (1869-1943), née Vincent, Henry Thomas Selover was born at South Yarra, Victoria on 24 July 1898.

He married Eileen Mary Ambrose (1902-1993) on 14 August 1924. The had two children: Wendy Patricia Selover (1925-1999), later Mrs. George Henry Yates, and Peter Vincent Selover (1929-2017).

Death
He died at Carrum Downs, Victoria on 18 May 2001.

Notes

References
 Holmesby, Russell & Main, Jim (2009), The Encyclopedia of AFL Footballers: every AFL/VFL player since 1897 (8th ed.), Seaford, Victoria: BAS Publishing. 
 Selover fills Bowling Breach, The Sporting Globe, (Saturday, 28 November 1925), p.6.</ref>

External links 
 
 
 Harry Selover, at ''Demonwiki".

1898 births
2001 deaths
Australian rules footballers from Victoria (Australia)
Melbourne Football Club players
Australian centenarians
Men centenarians